Scott Anderson may refer to:

Entertainment
Scott Anderson (novelist), war correspondent and novelist
Scott E. Anderson (born 1964), American visual effects artist
Scott S. Anderson, writer and director of the film The Best Two Years
Scott Anderson, lead singer of the Canadian alternative rock band Finger Eleven
Scott Anderson (Hollyoaks), a character in UK soap opera Hollyoaks

Sports
Scott Anderson (American football) (born 1951), American football player with the Minnesota Vikings
Scott Anderson (athlete) (born 1974), track athlete
Scott Anderson (baseball) (born 1962), former MLB pitcher
Scott Anderson (field hockey) (born 1968), goalkeeper from New Zealand
Scott Anderson (rugby league) (born 1986), Australian rugby league footballer
Scott Anderson (sailor) (born 1954), Australian sailor
Scott Anderson (racing driver) (born 1989), American racing driver
Scotty Anderson (born 1979), former American football wide receiver

Others
A. Scott Anderson (1904–1971), mayor of Richmond, Virginia
Scott Anderson (physicist) (1913–2006), founder of APL Engineered Materials
Scott D. Anderson (1965–1999), pilot, author, and adventurer
Scott Keir Anderson (born 1963), Senior Vice-president of Canwest
Scott Charles Anderson, programmer, author, illustrator